HKL may refer to:

 Handball Korea League
 Hattha Kaksekar, a Cambodian microfinance organization
 Helsinki City Transport
 Hongkong Land, a land developer in Hong Kong
 Kuala Lumpur Hospital
 Miller index (hkℓ), describing crystal lattice planes